Thiago Thomas Nuss (born 2 February 2001) is an Argentine professional footballer who plays as a forward for Argentinos Juniors.

Career
Nuss began his career with Deportivo Español. He was promoted into their senior squad midway through the 2018–19 season at the age of eighteen, making his professional bow during a Primera B Metropolitana loss to Acassuso on 23 February 2019. Two appearances later, Nuss scored their sole goal in a win over Flandria on 4 March. In the succeeding May, Nuss netted a brace in a 2–1 win versus Comunicaciones. Despite three goals in twelve matches, only one of which was as a starter, Nuss couldn't prevent Deportivo Español suffering relegation to Primera C Metropolitana.

In December 2019, Nuss joined Argentinos Juniors, signing a 3-year contract. In the first couple of months, Nuss turned out for Argentinos' reserve team. To gain some experience, he was loaned out to Atlético de Rafaela in September 2020 until the end of the year. Nuss didn't play a professional game for Argentinos until 2022.

Career statistics
.

References

External links

2001 births
Living people
Sportspeople from Buenos Aires Province
Argentine people of German descent
Argentine footballers
Association football forwards
Primera B Metropolitana players
Primera Nacional players
Argentine Primera División players
Deportivo Español footballers
Argentinos Juniors footballers
Atlético de Rafaela footballers